James Vallance is the name of:

Jim Vallance (born 1952), Canadian musician
Jimmy Vallance, Scottish footballer